Mizerna, cicha is a popular traditional Christmas carol in Poland, whose lyrics were written by
Teofil Lenartowicz in 1849. The original melody was written by Jakub Wrzeciono in the 19th century, but nowadays the best-known version was composed by Jan Gall around the year 1900.

Lyrics 

The song originally had 11 verses
of which people nowadays typically sing four or five, which are listed below.

References

External links 
IMSLP sheet music for Mizerna cicha
Chester Childrens Choir perform Mizerna cicha in English
Edyta Gorniak: Mizerna cicha / Official Music Video
Hanna Banaszak – Wigilia z Hanną Banaszak

1849 songs
Christmas carols
Polish songs